The Big C may refer to:

The Big C (TV series), a Showtime original series starring Laura Linney 
The Big "C", a concrete "C" overlooking the University of California, Berkeley